Almah ( ‘almā, plural:  ‘ălāmōṯ), from a root implying the vigour of puberty, is a Hebrew word meaning a young woman ripe for marriage; despite its importance to the account of the virgin birth of Jesus in the Gospel of Matthew, scholars agree that it refers to a woman of childbearing age and has nothing to do with virginity. It occurs nine times in the Hebrew Bible.

Etymology and social context 

Almah derives from a root meaning "to be full of vigour, to have reached puberty". In the ancient Near East girls received value as potential wives and bearers of children: "A wife, who came into her husband's household as an outsider, contributed her labor and her fertility ... [h]er task was to build up the bet 'ab by bearing children, particularly sons" (Leeb, 2002). Scholars thus agree that almah refers to a woman of childbearing age without implying virginity. From the same root, the corresponding masculine word elem עֶלֶם 'young man' also appears in the Bible, as does alum (used in plural עֲלוּמִים) used in the sense '(vigor of) adolescence', in addition to the post-Biblical words almut (עַלְמוּת) and alimut (עֲלִימוּת) both used for youthfulness and its strength (distinct from post-Biblical Alimut אַלִּימוּת 'violence' with initial Aleph, although Klein's Dictionary states this latter root is likely a semantic derivation of the former, from 'strength of youth' to 'violence'). The Hebrew Bible uses an unrelated word, betulah (‏בְּתוּלָה), to refer to a virgin, as well as the idea of virginity, betulim (‏בְּתוּלִים).

Biblical usage 
The word almah occurs nine times in the Hebrew Bible:

A servant of Abraham tells his master how he met Rebecca. He prayed to the Lord that if an almah came to the well and he requested a drink of water from her, that should she then provide him with that drink and also water his camels; he would take that as a sign that she was to be the wife of Isaac. 
Miriam, an almah, is entrusted to watch the baby Moses; she takes thoughtful action to reunite the baby with his mother by offering to bring the baby to a Hebrew nurse maid (her mother).
In 1 Chronicles 15:20 and the heading to Psalm 46, the psalm is to be played "on alamot". The musical meaning of this phrase has become lost with time: it may mean a feminine manner of singing or playing, such as a girls' choir, or an instrument made in the city of "Alameth".
In a victory parade in Psalm 68:25, the participants are listed in order of appearance: 1) the singers; 2) the musicians; and 3) the "alamot" playing cymbals or tambourines.
 The Song of Songs 1:3 contains a poetic chant of praise to a man, declaring that all the alamot adore him. In verse 6:8 a girl is favorably compared to 60 Queens (wives of the King), 80 Concubines, and numberless alamot.
In Proverbs 30:19, concerning an adulterous wife, the Hebrew text and the Greek Septuagint differ: both begin by comparing the woman's acts to things the author claims are hard to predict: a bird flying in air, the movement of a snake over a rock, the path of a ship through the sea; but while the Hebrew concludes with the way of a man with an almah, the Greek reads "and the way of a man in his youth".
The verses surrounding Isaiah 7:14 tell how Ahaz, the king of Judah, is told of a sign to be given in demonstration that the prophet's promise of God's protection from his enemies is a true one. The sign is that an almah is pregnant and will give birth to a son who will still be very young when these enemies will be destroyed.

Greek translation 

The Septuagint translates most occurrences of almah into a generic word neanis νεᾶνις meaning 'young woman', both words being derived from neos 'new' and unrelated to virginity. Two occurrences, in the Genesis verse concerning Rebecca and in Isaiah 7:14, are mistranslated as parthenos (παρθένος), the basic word associated with virginity in Greek (it is a title of Athena 'The Virgin Goddess') but still occasionally used by the Greeks for a unmarried woman who is not a virgin. Most scholars agree that Isaiah's phrase ('a young woman shall conceive and bear a son') did not intend to convey any miraculous conception. In this verse, as in the Genesis occurrence concerning Rebecca, the Septuagint translators misused the Greek word parthenos generically to indicate an unmarried young woman, whose probable virginity (as unmarried young women were ideally seen at the time) was incidental.

References

Bibliography 

 
 
 
 
 
 
 
 
 
 
 

Book of Isaiah
Christianity and Judaism related controversies
Hebrew words and phrases in the Hebrew Bible
Christian terminology
Virgin birth of Jesus